Fort São Jerónimo is a former fortification of the Portuguese empire built on the island of São Tomé, in São Tomé and Principe, 1,5 kilometers to the south of Fort São Sebastião.

It was built in 1613, during the reign of King Philip I of Portugal, after French privateers attacked the island in 1567, and the Angolares revolted in 1574; it was restored in 1801, during the Napoleonic Wars.

It has a square plan and is currently in ruins.

See also
Portuguese Empire
List of buildings and structures in São Tomé and Príncipe

References

Portuguese fortifications